Cameron Joyce is an Australian rules football coach of the Gold Coast Suns women's team in the AFL Women's (AFLW).

Early life and administrative career
Joyce was born in Perth, Western Australia in 1980. His father, Alan was a professional Australian rules footballer who played for Hawthorn in the 1960s and coached the Hawks to a pair of VFL/AFL premierships in 1988 and 1991. Cameron moved with his family to Melbourne at a young age when his father decided to pursue VFL coaching opportunities which also included a stint as the head coach of the Western Bulldogs. He played junior football for Glen Iris as well as Oakleigh and although he was invited to train with Hawthorn during their 1998 pre-season, he was not selected by the Hawks. Following high school graduation, Joyce turned his attention to an off field role when Richmond handed him a video analysis position at the club and he was promoted to a football administration assistant role the following year. He accepted similar roles with North Melbourne and West Coast in the following years before being given his big break in 2008 when he was appointed the list manager of North Melbourne. Joyce was appointed the General Manager of Football at North Melbourne in 2016 and held that position for three years.

Coaching career
Following his administrative career, Joyce accepted a coaching and development role with AFL Tasmania in October 2019.

AFLW
Joyce was appointed the head coach of the Gold Coast Suns women's team on 2 June 2021. He became the first Gold Coast coach to secure back-to-back AFLW wins when his team defeated West Coast and Richmond in rounds 2 and 3 of his first season as head coach.

References

Living people
AFL Women's coaches
1980 births
Australian rules football coaches
Sportspeople from Perth, Western Australia
Sportspeople from Melbourne